Plim Plim  is an Argentine series of children's folk songs. It was later adapted into an animated television series created by Smilehood, broadcast on Disney Junior for all Latin America. The pre-release was aired on 21 September 2011 and was officially launched on 1 October of the same year. This animated series consists of 7-minute-long episodes and its main goal is to promote human values such as solidarity, honesty, responsibility, early habits and respect for the environment. This series is inspired from and based on the teachings of Sri Sri Ravi Shankar the founder of Art of Living Foundation. When the television show got more attention they decided to dub it in English.

The series revolves around the adventures of Plim Plim, a child who combines the features of a clown, hero and a magician. He accompanies his friends and teaches positive values as well as how to take care of our planet through setting examples. "Plim Plim Clown, Hero's heart", is based on the essence of each one of these values, analyzing the nuances which make them different and reinforces them to achieve a simple, direct and effective education, keeping a dynamic balance between learning and entertainment.

Plim Plim helps his pals whenever they face situations that cannot be taken care of at school and leads them to a magical world where they can have fun and learn too. Plim Plim is a generous, valiant, and enthusiastic child whose stories are portrayed as fables, including all sorts of visual and musical traits that result in the creation of multi-target content which also embraces parents and educators.

A new music style named FunKids was created for the series and it is a fusion between rhythms and styles as varied as funk, circus, and Balkan music.

Characters in the series

Magical characters

Plim Plim: He is the title character of the series. He is a boy who combines the features of a clown, a hero, and a magician. He is the only human in this story. He shows up magically from a magical space-time. He is generous, valiant, enthusiastic, and well-intentioned. His characteristical phrase: "Of course you do!".

Wichiwichi Wichiwi: He is a little bird, Plim Plim's boon companion and messenger. His language sounds exactly like his name, but he is whistled. He carries messages from Plim Plim and belongs in the same magical world. Nobody knows how he comes or how he goes. He is the link between Plim Plim and the children and is always interacting with them. Sometimes he is a bit clumsy.

Tuni: It's a magical vehicle. Children's joy fuels it. It's a car that can be transformed into an airplane, a helicopter, a boat, a submarine, an adventure machine, and even a bus, adjusting to the need of the challenge at hand.

Other characters

Nesho: He is an elephant. His name has an oriental origin. He is intellectual, deductive, smart, structured, and orderly yet, slow and gifted with such a great memory. His favorite instrument is the tuba. His characteristic phrase: "How interesting!".

Bam: He is a bear. He is sweet, cute, fun-loving, and very sensory. His name has Latin origins. His favorite instrument is the drum. His characteristic phrase: "Delicious!".

Acuarella: She is a small rabbit who loves arts. She is cheerful, imaginative, dreamy, and permanently enamored, yet, a bit absent-minded, forgetful, and uses to easily loses her concentration. She is a fan of European origins. Her favorite instrument is the xylophone. Her characteristic phrase: "I love it!".

Mei-Li: She is a cat. She is coquette, dynamic, athletic, and vigorous but she is also a tad anxious. She does everything fastly. Her name has Chinese origins and means "beautiful". Her favorite instrument is the keytar. Her characteristic phrase: "Yes! Yeah! Yeah! Yeah!".

Hoggie: He is a pig who likes to contradict everybody. He is characterized by being moody, grumpy, and selfish. His name has an Anglo-Saxon origin and means "pig" in English. He is a good athlete and a musician. His favorite instrument is the saxophone. His characteristic phrase: "Me neither".

Arafa: She is a giraffe. She is a sweet, sympathetic, and motherly teacher. She is the only adult in the series. Her name is revered as Giraffa. She imparts her modicum of wisdom and motherly care. Her favorite phrase: "Good luck!".

Sun: He looks at everything happening around him and follows the actions of the characters with her gestures.

Character's preferences

The creators
Guillermo Pino and Claudio Pousada are the creators of the series.

Plim Plim fans
Plim Plim has a Fan Page on Facebook with 782.259(as on 00:40 hrs July 23, 2021) of  fans -number which keeps on raising- with an average of 260 new fans per day. There, fans are provided with content of high quality for both children and parents, such as activities, games, quizzes, greeting cards, and postcards. The material is shared by users who come mostly from Argentina, Mexico, Colombia, and Chile.

Dubbing

Nominations
 2013 Martín Fierro Awards
 Best program for kids

References

External links
 
 Smilehood's Official Site
 Plim Plim's Official Facebook
 Plim Plim's Official Facebook in Portuguese

2010s Argentine television series
2010s animated television series
2011 Argentine television series debuts
Argentine children's animated television series
Animated television series about children
Animated preschool education television series
2010s preschool education television series
Television series by Disney